Gerald Wayne "Jerry" Welsh (born April 1950) is a Canadian former ice hockey player, and college ice hockey head coach at Ohio State University. He is a 2008 inductee of the Oshawa Sports Hall of Fame as both a player and a builder.

Career as player

NCAA
Born in Oshawa, Ontario, Jerry Welsh played college ice hockey at Ohio State from 1969-73. In 1971-72, Welsh led the team with 28 goals helping the Buckeyes earn their first and only Central Collegiate Hockey Association regular season title and the school's first CCHA tournament title. In three of Welsh's four years at Ohio State, he was voted the team's most valuable player.

Professional
Following college, Welsh played briefly for the Minnesota Fighting Saints of the World Hockey Association for his former Ohio State coach Harry Neale in 1973. He spent the next two seasons (1973–75) in the North American Hockey League. In 1974-75, Welsh was alternate captain and second-leading scorer for the NAHL's Johnstown Jets that won the Lockhart Cup playoffs. The team and championship served as the inspiration for the movie Slap Shot.

Career as coach 
Following his playing career in minor league hockey, Jerry Welsh, just 25 years old, was hired as head coach at Ohio State in 1975. Welsh brought stability to an Ohio State program that had seen five different coaches in 11 seasons. Under Welsh, Ohio State finished in second place in the CCHA five times in six seasons between 1979 and 1984. In 1983, Welsh was named CCHA Coach of the Year after guiding the Buckeyes to a 21-7-4 conference record and a second place finish (based on points).

Welsh helped elevate Ohio State to its first top ten national ranking in December 1978 and its first No. 1 national ranking for three of four weeks in November 1983 after beginning the 1983-84 season on a 13-game winning streak. The Buckeyes finished the 1978–79, 1979–80, 1982–83, and 1983-84 seasons nationally ranked in the top ten.

Despite success on the ice, Welsh was one of the lowest paid head coaches in NCAA Division I ice hockey in 1984. Ohio State was also the only CCHA program without a full-time assistant coach. Welsh's frustration with funding for hockey at Ohio State led him to pursue other Division I coaching opportunities, which never came to fruition.

Welsh was unable to maintain early success at Ohio State. He resigned on February 14, 1995 when Ohio State athletic director Andy Geiger informed Welsh his contract would not be renewed at season's end.

Personal 
Jerry Welsh married the former Paula Konesny. Together, the couple owns and operates Garden Grove Bed & Breakfast in Union Pier, Michigan.
They sold the B & B in 2020

Head coaching record

† Welsh resigned in January after losing 6 consecutive games.

Awards and honours

References

External links
 http://www.uscho.com/stats/coach/mid,491/jerry-welsh/
 http://www.hockeydb.com/ihdb/stats/pdisplay.php?pid=8693

1950 births
Living people
Ice hockey people from Ontario
Ohio State Buckeyes men's ice hockey players
Ohio State Buckeyes men's ice hockey coaches
Sportspeople from Oshawa
Canadian ice hockey forwards